Flemming Steen Pedersen (born 6 June 1963) is a Danish football manager who works as technical director of Danish Superliga club FC Nordsjælland and their Right to Dream Academy.

Pedersen was the manager of various clubs in Northern Zealand before joining FC Nordsjælland as youth coach in 2006. He later became Kasper Hjulmand's assistant in Nordsjælland and Mainz 05 and had a brief spell at Brentford in a backroom role and as B team head coach, before returning to Nordsjælland as technical director. In February 2019 it was announced that he would succeed Hjulmand as manager of FC Nordsjælland in the summer, but when Hjulmand left the club in March 2019, Pedersen was named manager immediately.

On 7 January 2023, Nordsjælland confirmed that Pedersen had decided to step down from his head coach position, despite Nordsjælland being in first place in the Danish Superliga. However, Pedersen would continue as part of Nordsjælland's coaching staff for the remainder of the season, in addition to being the technical director of the Right to Dream Academy.

Managerial statistics

References

External links
FC Nordsjælland profile

1963 births
Living people
People from Gribskov Municipality
Danish men's footballers
FC Helsingør players
Danish football managers
FC Nordsjælland managers
Brentford F.C. non-playing staff
Danish Superliga managers
FC Helsingør managers
Association footballers not categorized by position
Sportspeople from the Capital Region of Denmark